Geraldo Reyes Jr. is an American politician serving as a member of the Connecticut House of Representatives from the 75th district. He assumed office on April 28, 2016.

Education 
Reyes earned an Associate of Science degree in industrial technology from Waterbury State Technical College and a Bachelor of Science in industrial technology management from Central Connecticut State University.

Career 
From 2002 to 2010, Reyes worked as a general manager at Sargent Manufacturing. He later worked as an administrative aide to mayor Neil O'Leary. Since 2016, he has worked as a journalist and photographer for The Waterbury Observer. He was elected to the Connecticut House of Representatives and assumed office on April 28, 2016. During the 2017 legislative session, Reyes served as the vice chair of the House Commerce Committee.

References 

Living people
Central Connecticut State University alumni
Democratic Party members of the Connecticut House of Representatives
Hispanic and Latino American state legislators in Connecticut
People from Waterbury, Connecticut
21st-century American politicians
Year of birth missing (living people)